Qasr al-'Ashiq is a historical palace that dates back to the Abbasid era, located near the city of Samarra, Iraq.

Location
It is situated at 16km west of the modern city of Samarra, on the western bank of the Tigris.

History
The palace was commissioned under the 15th Abbasid caliph Al-Mu'tamid, and construction took place during 877–882. Accounts differ regarding the person who was assigned to construct this palace. Yaqut al-Hamawi mentions the name of Ali bin Yahi al-Munajam and Moez al-Dawla who initiated the groundbreaking. Emir 'Amad al-Dawla wrote a poem about this palace. During the medieval period, it was referred to as "al-Ma'shuq" which means "beloved". The palace was excavated in 1960s and restored during the 1980s.

Architecture
Qasr al-'Ashiq is a prominent surviving example of the Abbasid architectural style palace. The building is rectangular shaped and consists of two floors, one of which has been used as catacombs and vaults. It is surrounded by large yards, which are surrounded by walls. Outside the walls exist a long moat, in which water flows from the underground channel which begins from the western highlands. Surface of the moat is higher than the nearby river.

Gallery

References

Buildings and structures completed in the 9th century
Abbasid architecture
Abbasid palaces
Buildings and structures in Samarra
Palaces in Iraq